Theodore James van Houten (9 August 1952 – 7 April 2016) was a Dutch-British writer, journalist, columnist, radio-theatre producer, critic, and translator.

Notable works 
 Leonid Trauberg and his Films: Always the Unexpected, 's-Hertogenbosch: Art & Research, 1989. .
 'Eisenstein was Great Eater': In Memory of Leonid Trauberg, 's-Hertogenbosch: A & R, Buren: GP, 1991. .
 Silent Cinema Music in the Netherlands: the Eyl/Van Houten Collection of Film and Cinema Music in the Nederlands Filmmuseum, Buren: Knuf, 1992. .
 Er komt een andere tijd: oorlogsherinneringen van Klaas van Houten, 's-Hertogenbosch: Art & Research, 1993. .
 Muziek in Theresientadt, origineel: Karas, J: Music in Terezin, NY 1990.  (vertaling en Ned. bewerking)
 Dmitri Sjostakovitsj (1906-1975): een leven in angst, Westervoort: Van Gruting, 2006. .
 Broek, Gerard van den: The Return of the Cane, Utrecht: International Books, 2007.  (English editing)
 Een vrij ernstig geval: Aalsmeer en Aalsmeerders in oorlogstijd, Westervoort [etc.]: Van Gruting, 2011. , .
 Op Aalsmeer, schetsen en verhalen, Aalsmeer: Art & Research / Cocu, 2011. 
 De oorlog in jouw dorp, Aalsmeer: Art & Research / Cocu / Comite de oorlog in jouw dorp, 2013. 
 Geboren aan de N201, schetsen en verhalen, Aalsmeer: Art & Research / Cocu, 2014.

References

1952 births
2016 deaths
Dutch journalists
Dutch male writers
Dutch political writers
Dutch male dramatists and playwrights
Dutch biographers
Dutch male short story writers
Dutch short story writers
Dutch columnists
Dutch translators
Dutch literary critics
Dutch radio producers
Dutch theatre managers and producers
Dutch critics
Dutch music critics
Dutch expatriates in Scotland
Dutch film critics
Dutch theatre critics
Music historians
Writers about music
Writers on antisemitism
People from Aalsmeer
20th-century Dutch dramatists and playwrights
20th-century Dutch male writers
21st-century Dutch dramatists and playwrights
21st-century Dutch male writers
20th-century translators
Male biographers